O3b mPOWER is a communications satellite system currently under construction and deployment. The first two satellites were launched on 16 December 2022 and commercial service is expected to begin in Q3 2023. Owned and operated by SES, O3b mPOWER initially comprises 11 high-throughput and low-latency satellites in a medium Earth orbit (MEO), along with ground infrastructure and intelligent software, to provide multiple terabits of global broadband connectivity for applications including cellular backhaul to remote rural locations and simultaneous international IP trunking.

The O3b mPOWER satellites use fully shapable and steerable spot beams that can be shifted and scaled in real time to suit individual users. The satellites will join SES' existing constellation of 20 first-generation O3b satellites in MEO and operate in conjunction with them and the SES fleet of geostationary satellites.

Satellites 
The O3b mPOWER satellites are based on Boeing's multi-orbit BSS-702X satellite bus with an all-electric propulsion system and a payload that can be reprogrammed from the ground to reallocate resources "on the fly".

The electronically steered phased array antennas can provide up to 5000 spot beams per satellite each shaped and pointed as required to specifically distribute power and bandwidth to individual user's terminals and, using the full Ka-band spectrum, enable uncontended speeds from 50 Mbit/s up to 10 Gbit/s.

With frequency reuse, each O3b mPOWER satellite can deliver hundreds of gigabits in capacity, with multi-terabit capabilities across the full constellation. SES' Adaptive Resource Control (ARC) software and digital payload processing systems synchronise space and ground system resources to electronically control routing, power levels, throughput, and frequency allocation dynamically, in real time.

Coverage 
From MEO, the O3b mPOWER satellites can deliver high-bandwidth connectivity between latitudes 50° N and 50° S (covering 96% of the global population) to mobile and/or remote terminals of 0.3 m to 5.5 m, and is expected to find application in the following markets:
 Mobility: cruise, commercial shipping, aero 
 Telecom: telco, mobile network operators, cloud providers 
 Government: military, government agencies, non-governmental organisations 
 Enterprise: oil and gas, mining 

Proposed additional satellites operating in a second medium earth orbit at an inclination of 70° would give near-complete global coverage.

History 
In September 2017, SES announced Boeing would build seven "super-powered" medium earth orbit satellites for launch in 2021 to provide flexible and scalable, low-latency satellite-based networks with terabits of throughput, hugely expanding the capacity of the existing constellation of 12 (now 20) first-generation O3b satellites.

In March 2018, SES announced partnerships with Alcan Systems, Isotropic Systems and Viasat to develop compact, high-throughput user terminals for the O3b mPOWER system.

In September 2019, SES announced it had partnered with satellite payload and network management systems developer, Kythera Space Solutions to develop the ARC (Adaptive Resource Control) software to enable the dynamic control and optimisation of power, throughput, beams and frequency allocation on O3b mPOWER and other future high-throughput satellites (such as the geostationary SES-17, launched in October 2021; in position and fully operational in June 2022). 

Also in September 2019, SpaceX was contracted to launch the first seven O3b mPOWER satellites using Falcon 9 rockets with two launches of four and three satellites planned for 2021.

In February 2020, Princess Cruises announced a partnership with SES for early access to the O3b mPOWER system, using a hybrid network of both MEO and geostationary satellites to provide connectivity to its fleet at sea. Also in February 2020, Orange, a user of the first generation O3b system in Africa and the Middle East since 2017, announced it would be the first telco to adopt the O3b mPOWER system, to extend its consumer and business broadband services in Africa, providing connectivity to remote locations, starting in the Central African Republic.

In August 2020, the order for an additional four O3b mPOWER satellites, also from Boeing, was announced. These satellites will be more powerful than the original seven, increasing the total throughput of the entire O3b mPOWER constellation by 90%. The expected launch pattern for the whole O3b mPOWER constellation was also changed, with SpaceX contracted to provide two further launches on Falcon 9 rockets, each rocket carrying a maximum of three satellites, and the first three satellites expected to launch late in 2021, six more on two launches in 2022, and the final two in 2024.

In September 2020, SES and Microsoft announced that SES was the medium Earth orbit connectivity partner for the Microsoft Azure Orbital ground station service that enables network operators to control their satellite operations and capacity from within the Azure cloud computing service. Under their agreement, SES and Microsoft will jointly invest in Azure Orbital ground stations for the MEO and Earth Observation segments, initially in the United States, which will be installed and managed by SES. Also, satellite telemetry, tracking and control systems and data ground stations for the O3b mPOWER satellites will be located with Microsoft's Azure edge sites to provide O3b mPOWER customers with "one-hop" access to Azure cloud services.

In November 2020, SES announced that Gilat and ST Engineering  are developing the modem platforms and ground infrastructure for the O3b mPOWER communications system. In December 2020, SES agreed with Australian telco, Pivotel Group Pty to build a new ground station at Pivotel's teleport in Dubbo, New South Wales to use the O3b mPOWER system to provide high-speed, low-latency connectivity across Australia, New Zealand and the Pacific Islands.

In February 2021, SES announced that four of the five top cruise companies have contracted connectivity services using the O3b mPOWER system ahead of the satellites' launch and with the majority extending beyond 2025.

In August 2021, Microsoft became the first cloud computing provider customer for the O3b satellite system, with Microsoft buying managed satellite connectivity services from SES for the Microsoft Azure cloud service. Microsoft is initially using the existing first generation O3b satellites, before upgrading to the faster broadband speeds from O3b mPOWER satellites when they come into operation in 2022.

In February 2022, SES formed a joint venture with India's biggest telco, Jio Platforms (JPL). The newly formed Jio Space Technology Limited will deliver broadband services in India of up to 100Gbps capacity, using both the O3b mPOWER constellation and SES's SES-12 high-throughput geostationary satellite, to extend JPL’s terrestrial network, enhancing access to digital services in unconnected areas within India and the region. JPL and SES will own 51% and 49% equity stake respectively in the new company.

In February 2022, Orange announced that, along with SES, it will deploy and manage the first O3b mPOWER gateway in Africa, to provide high-speed, low-latency, and cloud-optimised connectivity services across Africa, and to support telemetry, tracking and command functions for the O3b mPOWER satellites. The gateway will be located at the Sonatel teleport in Gandoul, Senegal.

In March 2022, SES announced the acquisition of DRS Global Enterprise Solutions (GES), a US-based subsidiary of defence contractor, Leonardo DRS which provides managed satcom services to the US Defence Department and other government agencies. When the transaction is concluded (expected towards the end of 2022 after regulatory approvals) the business will be combined with SES subsidiary, SES Government Solutions (now SES Space & Defense), greatly expanding market access for the O3b mPOWER system at the time it is planned to begin operations.

In May 2022, SES announced that the revised launch schedule for the O3b mPOWER satellites would see the first six satellites carried two at a time on three launches in the third quarter of 2022, the next three on one rocket in Q4 2022 and the final two in 2024. The start of service for the O3b mPOWER system remains unchanged as the beginning of 2023. This schedule was subsequently changed in August 2022.

In May 2022, SES subsidiary SES Government Solutions (now SES Space & Defense), in partnership with Earth imaging company Planet Labs PBC, was awarded a US$28.96 million contract from NASA’s Communications Services Project for real-time, always-on low-latency connectivity services to NASA spacecraft, using SES's geostationary orbit satellites and medium Earth orbit satellites, including the O3b mPOWER constellation.

In June 2022, SES announced that it will provide global connectivity services to MSC Cruises using the O3b mPOWER system. The service will start on the Explora I, the first ship of MSC's forthcoming luxury cruise line Explora Journeys, expected to enter service in Spring 2023.

In August 2022, SES revealed that the O3b mPOWER launch schedule had been revised again. The first six O3b mPOWER satellites would now be carried on three launches in Q4 2022, the fourth launch of O3b mPOWER 7 and 8 would be in 2023 and the fifth, for O3b mPOWER 9, 10 and 11, in 2024. The system was expected to start service in Q2 2023.

In October 2022, SES announced a capacity deal with telco, Claro Brasil (through its Embratel division) to use the O3b mPOWER network to extend its mobile backhaul service serving more than 260,000 inhabitants of the eight cities in the isolated Amazon region. SES already serves other communities in the region with backhaul capacity delivered via its geostationary satellite. The O3b mPOWER network will provide 4 Gbps and will be able to support both 4G and 5G networks.

In November 2022, SES announced further delays to the O3b mPOWER launch schedule. The first two O3b mPOWER satellites would now be launched in mid-December 2022, The next four satellites would be carried on two launches in Q1 2023, two more on another launch later in 2023, and the final three satellites launched in 2024. it will take approximately six months after launch for each satellite to reach its designated orbit and for commissioning, and the O3b mPower service is now expected to start in Q3 2023.

The first two O3b mPOWER satellites were successfully launched from Cape Canaveral Space Force Station in Florida at 5:48 pm local time on 16 December 2022. The two satellites had been 'mated' and fueled with the Xenon gas for their plasma thrusters at Boeing’s factory in El Segundo, California before delivery to Cape Canaveral, considerably reducing the time required at  the spaceport to ready them for launch.

List of satellites

See also 

 O3b
 SES S.A. 
 O3b Networks
 Boeing 702 satellite bus
 SpaceX

References 

Communications satellites
SpaceX commercial payloads
Spacecraft launched in 2022
Satellites in medium Earth orbit
SES satellites